Steve Sheldon is an American politician from Kentucky. He is a member of the Republican party and represented District 17 in the Kentucky House of Representatives from January 1, 2019 to January 1, 2023. He sponsored numerous pieces of legislation for Kentuckians. He has represented the Treasury, Auditor, Veterans, Physician Assistants, teachers and Pharmacy etc. in the State House.

References

External links 
 Official website

Living people
Republican Party members of the Kentucky House of Representatives
21st-century American politicians
Year of birth missing (living people)